Cape Verde participated at the 2018 Summer Youth Olympics in Buenos Aires, Argentina from 6 October to 18 October 2018.

Competitors

Athletics

Boys

Girls

Taekwondo

References

2018 in Cape Verdean sport
Nations at the 2018 Summer Youth Olympics
Cape Verde at the Youth Olympics